The Adventures of Priscilla, Queen of the Desert is a 1994 Australian road comedy film written and directed by Stephan Elliott. The plot follows two drag queens, played by Hugo Weaving and Guy Pearce, and a transgender woman, played by Terence Stamp, as they journey across the Australian Outback from Sydney to Alice Springs in a tour bus that they have named "Priscilla", along the way encountering various groups and individuals.

The film was a surprise worldwide hit and its positive portrayal of LGBT individuals helped to introduce LGBT themes to a mainstream audience. It received predominantly positive reviews and won an Academy Award for Best Costume Design at the 67th Academy Awards. Among other designers the film's costume department included many pieces of costume jewelry by Ziggy Attias of Ziggy Originals, NYC. It was screened in the Un Certain Regard section of the 1994 Cannes Film Festival and became a cult classic both in Australia and abroad. Priscilla subsequently provided the basis for a musical, Priscilla, Queen of the Desert, which opened in 2006 in Sydney before travelling to New Zealand, the United Kingdom, Canada, and Broadway.

Plot
Anthony "Tick" Belrose (Hugo Weaving), using the drag pseudonym of Mitzi Del Bra, is a Sydney-based drag queen who accepts an offer to perform his drag act at Lasseters Hotel Casino Resort managed by his estranged wife Marion in Alice Springs, a remote town in central Australia. After persuading his friends and fellow performers, Bernadette Bassenger (Terence Stamp), a recently bereaved transgender woman, and Adam Whitely (Guy Pearce), a flamboyant and obnoxious younger drag queen who goes under the drag name Felicia Jollygoodfellow, to join him, the three set out for a four-week run at the casino in a large tour bus, which Adam christens "Priscilla, Queen of the Desert."

While on the long journey through remote lands bordering the Simpson Desert, they meet a variety of characters, including a group of friendly Aboriginal Australians for whom they perform, the less accepting attitudes of rural Australia in such towns as Coober Pedy, and are subjected to homophobic abuse and violence, including having their bus vandalized with homophobic graffiti.

When the bus breaks down in the middle of the desert, Adam spends the whole day repainting it lavender to cover up the vandalism. The trio later meet Bob, a middle-aged mechanic from a small outback town who joins them on their journey after his wife leaves him. Before they arrive at Alice Springs, Tick reveals that Marion is actually his wife, as they never divorced, and that they are actually going there as a favour to her. Continuing their journey, Adam is almost mutilated by a homophobic gang before he is saved by Bob and Bernadette. Adam is shaken and Bernadette comforts him, allowing them to reach an understanding. Likewise, the others come to terms with the secret of Tick's marriage and resolve their differences. Together, they fulfill a long-held dream of Adam's, which, in the original plan, is to climb Kings Canyon in full drag regalia.

Upon arrival at the hotel, it is revealed that Tick and Marion also have an eight-year-old son, Benjamin, whom Tick has not seen for many years. Tick is nervous about exposing his son to his drag profession and anxious about revealing his homosexuality, though he is surprised to discover that Benjamin already knows and is fully supportive of his father's sexuality and career. When their contract at the resort is over, Tick and Adam head back to Sydney, taking Benjamin back with them, so that Tick can get to know his son. However, Bernadette decides to remain at the resort for a while with Bob, who has decided to work at the hotel after the two of them had become close.

Cast
 Terence Stamp as Bernadette Bassenger
 Hugo Weaving as Anthony "Tick" Belrose/Mitzi Del Bra
 Guy Pearce as Adam Whitely/Felicia Jollygoodfellow
 Bill Hunter as Robert "Bob" Spart
 Sarah Chadwick as Marion Barber
 Mark Holmes as Benjamin Barber
 Julia Cortez as Cynthia Campos
 Ken Radley as Frank
 Daniel Kellie as Young Bernadette
 Leighton Picken as Young Adam
 Margaret Pomeranz (uncredited) as Adam's mother
 Stephan Elliott (uncredited) as Doorman

Production

Development
The Adventures of Priscilla, Queen of the Desert had originally been conceived by filmmakers Stephan Elliott and Stuart Quin, who were at the time in production of a film called Frauds. They and producer Andrena Finlay initially tried to pitch Priscilla to various financiers at the 1991 Cannes Film Festival, but were unsuccessful, and so instead took the film's concept to PolyGram and, with the backing of the Australian Film Finance Corporation, were able to begin production of the film on a relatively low budget of 2.7 million Australian dollars.

Elliott and the film's producers, Michael Hamlyn and Al Clark, agreed to work for $50,000 each, a relatively low fee for filmmakers at the time, while the lack of funding meant that the crew agreed to receive takings of the film's eventual profits in compensation for their low salaries. Due to the involvement of the Australian FFC, only one non-Australian actor was allowed to appear in the film, and Clark initially considered David Bowie, whom he had known back in the 1980s, and later briefly thought of John Hurt, although neither was available.

Casting
In May 1993, after travelling around the Australian Outback searching for appropriate sites to film in, Priscillas creators attended the Cannes Film Festival and Marche to advertise their project, hoping to capitalise on the selection of Elliot's first film Frauds, which was "In Competition" at the festival and despite the fact that they had not yet confirmed any actors for the roles. Their primary choice for the role of Bernadette was Tony Curtis, who read and approved of the script, but eventually became unavailable. They then approached John Cleese, who was not interested.

For the part of Tick, they had initially wanted Rupert Everett and for Adam they wanted Jason Donovan. However, at a pre-production casting meeting held at Cannes, Everett and Donovan did not get on well with one another and were found to be openly hostile toward the production staff. In light of this, it was readily agreed that they would not be suitable for the parts and the search for their three leading men would resume. However, Donovan would go on to play Tick in the West End musical adaptation of the film.

After unsuccessfully lobbying Colin Firth to play the role, producers eventually awarded the part to Hugo Weaving. Initially considering Tim Curry for the part of Bernadette, they cast Terence Stamp, who was initially anxious about the role because it was unlike anything that he had performed previously, although he eventually came on board with the concept. Stamp himself suggested Bill Hunter for the role of Bob, who accepted the role without even reading the script or being told anything about the greater concept of the film other than the basic character description, while Australian actor Guy Pearce (who had previously appeared with Donovan in the Australian soap opera Neighbours in the late 1980s) was hired at the eleventh hour to portray the sassy but spirited Adam.

Filming

The Imperial Hotel in Erskineville, Sydney was the filming location for the opening and closing scenes. The Imperial Hotel has hosted drag shows since 1983, and continues to be an icon for Sydney's LGBT community, with its restaurant renamed 'Priscillas' in honour of the film. Many scenes, including one where Bernadette encounters a butch, bigoted woman named Shirley, were filmed at the outback town of Broken Hill in New South Wales, largely in a hotel named Mario's Palace (now simply the Palace Hotel), which Al Clark believed was "drag queen heaven". Some small scenes were filmed in the All Nations Hotel. They also decided to film at Coober Pedy, a rough-and-tumble mining town in Central Australia which featured prominently in the film. The executive producer, Rebel Penfold-Russell, appears as the marathon runner.

Initially, they tried to get permission to film upon the geological formation formerly known as Ayers Rock or "the Rock" (Uluru), but this was rejected by organizations responsible for the monument, such as the Uluru Board of Management, as it would have been in violation of Indigenous Australian religious beliefs. Instead, the scene was filmed in King's Canyon. Dialogue from the scene was rewritten slightly to accommodate the new location.

Post-production
With filming over, the director and producers began editing the footage, repeatedly travelling to both London and to Los Angeles, which had then just been hit by the 1994 Northridge earthquake. Scenes were deleted on the advice of early viewers to shorten the film.

Release

Box office

Being an Australian film, not an American-produced Hollywood blockbuster, Priscilla was released as a minor commercial product in North America and other English-speaking nations.

Director Elliott noted that the audiences viewing the film in Australia, the United States, and France all reacted to it differently, going on to state that "At a screening we had for an Australian audience, they laughed at all the Aussieisms. The Americans laughed too, but at different jokes. There is a line where Tick says, 'Bernadette has left her cake out in the rain...', the Americans laughed for ten minutes." Tom O'Regan, a scholar of film studies, remarked that the film actually carried different meanings for members of different nationalities and subcultural groups, with LGBT Americans believing that the film was "the big one that will bring gay lifestyles into the mainstream", while Australians tended to "embrace it as just another successful Australian film".

Critical reaction
On Rotten Tomatoes, Priscilla has a 94% "Certified Fresh" rating based on 47 reviews, with an average rating of 7.3/10; the consensus states: "While its premise is ripe for comedy -- and it certainly delivers its fair share of laughs -- Priscilla is also a surprisingly tender and thoughtful road movie with some outstanding performances." Metacritic reports a 70 out of 100 rating, based on 20 critics, indicating "generally favorable reviews".

American film critic Roger Ebert of the Chicago Sun-Times felt that Bernadette was the key part of the film, stating that "the real subject of the movie is not homosexuality, not drag queens, not showbiz, but simply the life of a middle-aged person trapped in a job that has become tiresome." Janet Maslin of The New York Times wrote "The Adventures of Priscilla Queen of the Desert presents a defiant culture clash in generous, warmly entertaining ways." Peter Travers of Rolling Stone commented "In this roaringly comic and powerfully affecting road movie, Terence Stamp gives one of the year’s best performances." Kenneth Turan from the Los Angeles Times wrote "The comic pizazz and bawdy dazzle of this film’s vision of gaudy drag performers trekking across the Australian outback certainly has a boisterous, addictive way about it."

Accolades

Year-end lists 
 7th – Sean P. Means, The Salt Lake Tribune
 7th – Michael Mills, The Palm Beach Post
 Top 10 (listed alphabetically, not ranked) – Matt Zoller Seitz, Dallas Observer
 Top 10 Runner-ups – Bob Ross, The Tampa Tribune
 Best "sleepers" (not ranked) – Dennis King, Tulsa World
 Honorable mention – Dan Craft, The Pantagraph

Awards 

The film was ranked 7th on Logo's 50 Greatest Films with an LGBT theme, and #10 on AfterElton's Fifty Greatest Gay Movies list.

Cultural impact and legacy

Priscilla, along with other contemporary Australian films Young Einstein (1988), Sweetie (1989), Strictly Ballroom (1992), and Muriel's Wedding (1994), provided Australian cinema with a reputation for "quirkiness", "eccentricity" and "individuality" across the world. Both Priscilla and Muriel's Wedding (which had also featured a soundtrack containing ABBA songs) in particular became cult classics, not only in their native Australia, but also in the United Kingdom, where a wave of Australian influences, such as the soap operas Neighbours and Home & Away, had made their mark in the late 1980s and early 1990s.

In 1995, an American film, To Wong Foo, Thanks for Everything! Julie Newmar, was released, featuring three drag queens who travel across the United States. According to Al Clark, the creators of Priscilla heard about the film while shooting theirs, and "for a moment [were] troubled" until they read the script of To Wong Foo, when they decided that it was sufficiently different from Priscilla to not be a commercial and critical threat. To Wong Foo had a mixed critical response in comparison to Priscilla, but was a box office success in North America as it was a film from a major Hollywood studio and starred big-name actors. Like Priscilla, To Wong Foo has also enjoyed a cult following.

During the 2000 Summer Olympics closing ceremony, Priscilla was part of a parade of images of Australian popular culture. A 1980 Denning (resembling the bus used in the film) featuring a giant steel stiletto heel which extended from and retracted into the roof – inspired by scenes from the film – paraded around the Olympic Stadium. The bus was accompanied by several stiletto heel tricycle floats and drag queens in big wigs in tribute to the film's international success and the local Sydney gay community. The music video for Iggy Azalea's 2013 single "Work" paid homage to scenes from the film.

Racism and sexism controversy
The film has come under criticism for alleged racist and sexist elements, particularly in the portrayal of the Filipina character, Cynthia. Melba Marginson of the Centre for Filipino Concerns stated that Cynthia was portrayed as "a gold-digger, a prostitute, an entertainer whose expertise is popping out ping-pong balls from her sex-organ, a manic depressive, loud and vulgar. The worst stereotype of the Filipina." She argued that, by portraying Cynthia in this manner, the filmmakers were "violently kill[ing]" the dignity of Filipina women, something that she feared would lead to "more violence against us." An editor writing in The Age echoed these concerns, highlighting that "It is perhaps a pity that a film with a message of tolerance and acceptance for homosexuals should feel the need of what looks very much to us like a racist and sexist stereotype." Similarly, in his study of bisexuality in cinema, Wayne M. Bryant argued that while it was "an excellent film", The Adventures of Priscilla was marred by "instances of gratuitous sexism."

Producer Clark defended the film against these accusations, arguing that while Cynthia was a stereotype, it was not the purpose of filmmakers to avoid the portrayal of "vulnerable characters" from specific minority backgrounds. He stated that she was "a misfit like the three protagonists are, and just about everybody else in the film is, and her presence is no more a statement about Filipino women than having three drag queens is a statement about Australian men." Tom O'Regan noted that as a result of this controversy, the film gained "an ambiguous reputation."

Soundtrack

The film featured a soundtrack made up of pre-existing "camp classics" (pop music songs that have a particular fanbase in the LGBT community). The original plan by the film's creators was to have a Kylie Minogue song in the finale, although it was later decided that an ABBA song would be more appropriate because its "tacky qualities" were "more timeless" (although in the musical adaptation, the character Adam performs a medley of Kylie Minogue songs atop Uluru). The film itself featured four main songs, which were performed by two or more of the drag queens as a part of their show within the film; "I've Never Been to Me" by Charlene, "I Will Survive" by Gloria Gaynor, "Finally" by CeCe Peniston, and "Mamma Mia" by ABBA. On 23 August 1994, Fontana Island released the soundtrack on CD.

Original music for the soundtrack was composed by Guy Gross, with choral arrangements by Derek Williams, and released separately on CD.

Home media
On 14 November 1995, the film was released on VHS. On 7 October 1997, it was released on DVD with a collectable trivia booklet.

In 2004, a 10th Anniversary Collector's Edition was released on DVD in Australia with the following special features: a feature-length audio commentary with writer/director Stephan Elliott, three deleted scenes, two featurettes: "Behind the Bus: Priscilla with Her Pants Down" and "Ladies Please", cast and crew biographies, the original Australian theatrical trailer, US theatrical and teaser trailers, and a number of hidden features

In 2006, it was re-released on DVD in Australia with the following special features: a feature-length audio commentary with writer/director Elliott, "Birth of a Queen" (featurette), deleted scenes, tidbits from the Set, "The Bus from Blooperville" – Gag reel documentary, a photo gallery, and US theatrical and teaser trailers.

On 5 June 2007, it was re-released in the United States as the "Extra Frills Edition" DVD. This edition includes the same special features as the Australian 2006 re-release. On 7 June 2011, it was released for US Blu-ray.

See also
 Cinema of Australia
 To Wong Foo, Thanks for Everything! Julie Newmar (1995)
 Transgender characters in film and television

References

Bibliography

 
 
 
 
 
 
 
 

Further reading

External links
 
 
The Adventures of Priscilla Queen of the Desert at Oz Movies
 
 
 The Adventures of Priscilla, Queen of the Desert on AustralianScreen Online
 Iconic Priscilla bus given to Broken Hill – By Margaret Paul at Australian Broadcasting Corporation

1994 films
1990s English-language films
1990s adventure films
1990s buddy films
1994 comedy films
1994 independent films
1994 LGBT-related films
1990s road movies
Australian buddy films
Australian comedy films
Australian independent films
Australian LGBT-related films
Films directed by Stephan Elliott
Films set in Sydney
Films set in deserts
Films set in South Australia
Films about anti-LGBT sentiment
Films about buses
Films set in the Northern Territory
Films shot in Sydney
Films shot in New South Wales
Films shot in South Australia
Films that won the Best Costume Design Academy Award
Gramercy Pictures films
LGBT-related comedy films
PolyGram Filmed Entertainment films
Roadshow Entertainment films
Australian road movies
Films about trans women
Films scored by Guy Gross
Films adapted into plays
Films shot in the Northern Territory
Drag (clothing)-related films
BAFTA winners (films)
Films set in the Outback
LGBT-related buddy films